Deuterocohnia lorentziana is a plant species in the genus Deuterocohnia. This species is native to Bolivia.

References

lorentziana
Flora of Bolivia